Hypercompe albiscripta is a moth of the family Erebidae first described by Herbert Druce in 1901. It is found in Brazil.

References

albiscripta
Moths described in 1901